Saint Benedict is an unincorporated community in Cambria County, Pennsylvania, United States. Saint Benedict has a post office, with ZIP code 15773.

References

Unincorporated communities in Cambria County, Pennsylvania
Unincorporated communities in Pennsylvania